Standleya is a genus of flowering plants belonging to the family Rubiaceae.

It is native to eastern Brazil.

The genus name of Standleya is in honour of Paul Carpenter Standley (1884–1963), an American botanist. 
It was first described and published in Arq. Mus. Nac. Rio de Janeiro Vol.34 on page 119 in 1932.

Known species
According to Kew:
Standleya erecta 
Standleya glomerulata 
Standleya kuhlmannii 
Standleya limae 
Standleya prostrata

References

Rubiaceae
Rubiaceae genera
Plants described in 1932
Flora of Northeast Brazil
Flora of Southeast Brazil